Relational nouns or relator nouns are a class of words used in many languages. They are characterized as functioning syntactically as nouns, although they convey the meaning for which other languages use adpositions (i.e. prepositions and postpositions). In Central America, the use of relational nouns constitutes an areal feature of the Mesoamerican Linguistic Area, including the Mayan languages, Mixe–Zoquean languages, and Oto-Manguean languages. Relational nouns are also widespread in South-East Asia (e.g. Vietnamese, Thai), East Asia (e.g. Mandarin Chinese, Japanese, Tibetan), Central Asia (e.g. the Turkic languages), the Munda languages of South Asia (e.g. Sora), and in Micronesian languages.

A relational noun is grammatically speaking a simple noun, but because its meaning describes a spatial or temporal relation rather than a "thing", it describes location, movement, and other relations just as prepositions do in the languages that have them. When used the noun is owned by another noun and describes a relation between its "owner" and a third noun. For example, one could say "the cup is the table its-surface", where "its surface" is a relational noun denoting the position of something standing on a flat surface.

E.g., in Classical Nahuatl:

Similarly, in Japanese:

In Mandarin Chinese:

Or, in Turkish:

See also
Coverb
Adposition
Grammatical Case

References

Sources
 

Nouns by type